Batti Gul Meter Chalu is a 2018 Indian drama film directed by Shree Narayan Singh and produced by Bhushan Kumar, Nitin Chandrachud, Nishant Pitti and Krishan Kumar. The film tells the story of inflated electricity bills in rural India and stars Shahid Kapoor, Shraddha Kapoor, Divyendu Sharma and Yami Gautam.

Principal photography commenced in February 2018 in Tehri, Uttarakhand and was completed in July 2018. The film was released worldwide on 21 September 2018 to a mixed response.

Plot
Sushil Kumar "S.K." Pant (Shahid Kapoor), Lalita "Nauti" Nautiyal (Shraddha Kapoor) and Sundar Mohan Tripathi (Divyendu Sharma) are childhood friends based in Tehri, Uttarakhand. S.K. is an unscrupulous lawyer making money from out-of-court settlements. Nauti is an over the top fashion designer who thinks highly of herself. Wanting to get married, she decides to date both her childhood friends, each for a week. Things turn sour as S.K catches Nauti and Tripathi kissing. Heartbroken, he starts taunting and avoiding them.

He along with Nauti visit S.K for a solution, but instead, he insults them. With nowhere to go, Tripathi commits suicide. S.K is taken aback by the events and has a change of heart. He decides to fight out against SPTL, the privatised electricity company responsible for the inflated bills. SPTL has Gulnaar Rizvi as their lawyer against SK for the case.

On the last sitting of case with S.K about to win, Tripathi resurfaces and reveals about his suicide attempt and his struggles regarding inflated bills. The Court clears Tripathi's bill and cancels SPTL's License. It also orders them to pay Tripathi , and others  with similar complaints as a compensation. Tripathi is sentenced to six months of simple imprisonment for trying to dupe insurance company with his fake death. Gulnaar and S.K. are shown to be dating post the case.

Cast
 Shahid Kapoor as Sushil Kumar "SK" Pant
 Shraddha Kapoor as Lalita "Nauti" Nautiyal
 Divyendu Sharma as Sundar Mohan Tripathi / Ratul Gupta (faux name)
 Yami Gautam as Advocate Gulnaar Rizvi
 Farida Jalal as Lalita's grandmother
 Sushmita Mukherjee as Judge
 Samir Soni as Sanjay Bhaduriya, SPTL owner
 Rajendra Chawla as Janak Khanduri, complaint officer
 Sukhvinder Chahal as Pankaj Bahuguna, SPTL official
 Sudhir Pandey as D.N Pant, SK's father
 Supriya Pilgaonkar as Beena Nautiyal, Lalita's mother
 Atul Srivastava as Murarilal Tripathi, Sundar's father
 Anushka Ranjan as Rita Tripathi, Sundar's sister
 Brijendra Kala as Deendayal Gangotri Travels owner
 Badrul Islam as Kalyan
 Sharib Hashmi as Vikas
 Mukesh S Bhatt as Upreti
 Anna Ador as Ariana

Production

Principal photography
The principal photography for the film began in February 2018 with Shahid Kapoor and Shraddha Kapoor in Tehri, Uttarakhand. The first and second schedule of the film got wrapped in February 2018 and March 2018 respectively. Since, KriArj Entertainment, which was producing the film firstly got into financial troubles, the shoot of the film was kept on a halt, which finally got resumed in May 2018 and was wrapped up in June 2018. After the final schedule in July 2018, the film was finally wrapped up in the same month.

Casting
Director Shree Narayan Singh had already signed Shahid Kapoor to play a lawyer fighting against Faulty Electricity Meters and Inflated Bills in a local town of Uttarakhand. Later, Yami Gautam was signed as an opposition lawyer against Shahid Kapoor in the film. For the role of Lalita Nautiyal a.k.a. Nauti, actresses like Katrina Kaif, Ileana D'Cruz and Sonakshi Sinha were approached but later, it was confirmed that Shraddha Kapoor would be playing this role in the film.

Marketing and release
The film was originally slated to release on 31 August 2018 but was pushed to 14 September 2018 to avoid the clash with Shraddha Kapoor's other film, Stree starring Rajkummar Rao. The financial troubles faced by KriArj Entertainment lead to delays in the shooting of the film.

Later, it was announced that the film would have a worldwide release on 21 September 2018. The teaser of the film was released by T-Series on 18 October 2017. The trailer of the movie was released on 10 August 2018. Following a special screening on 20 September attended by the cast the film finally was released on 20 September 2018 in UAE and 21 September worldwide. The film had its TV world premiere on Zee Cinema on 16 February 2019.

Soundtrack 

The music of the film is composed by Anu Malik, Rochak Kohli, Sachet–Parampara while the lyrics are penned by Siddharth-Garima and Manoj Muntashir. Music was produced by Dj Phukan, Bharat Goel, Chandan Saxena, O2srk, Abhijit Vaghani. The songs featured in the film are sung Rahat Fateh Ali Khan, Arijit Singh, Atif Aslam, Mika Singh, Nakash Aziz, Prakriti Kakar and Sachet Tandon. The album of the film was by released T-Series on 5 September 2018. The music supervision was assisted by Vatsal Chevli.

Critical reception 

Batti Gul Meter Chalu generally received mixed reviews from critics. The film was lauded for its message, humor, performances and cinematography. The movie's running time and story execution faced criticism.

DNA in its 3.5 stars review criticized the storyline but praised the performance of Shahid Kapoor. " Shahid is top-notch. The actor, who is in his prime, has matured into a fine talent and shows that he can shoulder a film on his own. Half a star in the film's rating is reserved only for Shahid."

Rachit Gupta from TOI in his 3 stars review questioned the screenplay saying, "BGMC loses power under the load of its heavy-duty screenplay." He, however praised Shahid & Shraddha's performance adding, "Shahid is able to blend a fine balance between the over-confident young man and the guy with a heart of gold. His monologue during the climax is superb. Shraddha Kapoor plays the peppy small town girl with panache."

Rajeev Masand gave positive response praising the performances of the cast, message and humor of the film. He awarded it 3 stars noting "This is one of those mainstreammovies that delivers its message coated with a thick layer of melodrama. And it works." Shubhra Gupta from The Indian Express rated it 2.5 stars out of 5 praising the cinematography, message and humor of the film. She noted saying "Batti Gul Meter Chalu is careless not to get too much in lecture-mode. The rest of it made me smile, and made me pause: how do you expect people to live without ‘bijli’ in today's world? It is, as SK says thunderously, a fundamental right."

Another critic Shrishti Negi of News 18 praised performances of the cast, writing and the heart of the film. While criticized the sexist 'jibles', massage and the film's overstretched second half. Devesh Sharma of Filmfare quoted "All-in-all, Batti Gul Meter Chalu is a film which has its heart in the right place. Better editing and a shortening of length by twenty minutes would have made the film more impactful."

While critic Jyoti Sharma Bawa from Hindustan Times criticized the execution of the film quoting "The film takes almost 1.5 hours to establish what the trailer explained in three minutes" giving it two and half from five stars.

Legal issues
The shooting of the film got stalled in April 2018 due to the non-payment of dues by KriArj Entertainment. Later, in June 2018, producer Vashu Bhagnani claimed his rights over the film as the deal with KriArj Entertainment, which was denied by Bhushan Kumar, the current producer of the film.

The film's original and first writer Vipul K Rawal had filed a case against the Director and other writers for trying to deny him his rightful credit for the story, screenplay and dialogues of the film. Later, the matter was settled and it was decided that the credit for story, screenplay and dialogues will now be equally shared between Rawal along with Sidhartha Singh and Garima Wahal.

References

External links

2018 films
2010s Hindi-language films
Films scored by Sachet–Parampara
Films scored by Rochak Kohli
Films scored by Anu Malik
Films about social issues in India
Indian courtroom films
Indian legal films
Social realism in film
Films about corruption in India
Films shot in Uttarakhand
Films set in Uttarakhand